Needles and Pins is an American sitcom about a women's clothing manufacturer and his employees in New York City that aired from September 21, 1973, to December 28, 1973.

Cast
Norman Fell as Nathan Davidson
Louis Nye as Harry Karp
Deirdre Lenihan as Wendy Nelson
Sandra Deel as Sonia Baker
Bernie Kopell as Charlie Miller
Larry Gelman as Max Popkin
Alex Henteloff as Myron Russo
Milton Selzer as Julius Singer

Synopsis
Nathan Davidson is the owner of Lorelei Fashion House, a manufacturer of womens clothing located in New York Citys Garment District. His business partner is his dilettante brother-in-law, Harry Karp. Wendy Nelson, the daughter of a friend of Nathans, has just moved to New York City from Nebraska and taken a job with Lorelei as a fashion designer; she must adjust to the hectic pace of life in New York City in general and in the fashion industry in particular. Also working at Lorelei are Sonia Baker, the bookkeeper and secretary; Charlie Miller, the salesman; Max Popkin, the fabric cutter; and Myron Russo, the patternmaker. Julius Singer, Nathans archenemy, runs another fashion company that is Loreleis chief competitor.

Production notes

Deirdre Lenihan was a newcomer to television, and Needles and Pins gave her a prominent role in which to showcase her talents; her appearance during the opening credits is twice as long as that of any other featured character. Needles and Pins aired on NBC on Friday at 9:00 pm Eastern Time throughout its run. Episode directors were Hy Averback, Peter Baldwin,  George Tyne, and Ernest Losso.

Episodes

Sources list 14 Needles and Pins episodes. Ten of them aired in 1973. Apparently, the remaining four copyrighted in early 1974 after the shows last telecast were never broadcast.

References

External links 

Needles and Pins opening credits on YouTube

NBC original programming
1973 American television series debuts
1973 American television series endings
1970s American sitcoms
1970s American workplace comedy television series
Television series by Screen Gems
Television shows set in New York City
English-language television shows